Pterolepis may refer to:
 Pterolepis (bush cricket), a genus of bush crickets in the tribe Platycleidini
 Pterolepis, a fossil genus of jawless fishes in the family Pterygolepididae; synonym of Pterygolepis
Pterolepis (plant), a genus of flowering plants in the family Melastomataceae